Reno Luigi Alberton (30 March 1936 – 13 October 1996) was an Italian ice hockey player. He competed in the men's tournament at the 1956 Winter Olympics.

References

1936 births
1996 deaths
Ice hockey players at the 1956 Winter Olympics
Olympic ice hockey players of Italy
Ice hockey people from Milan